Yana Khuchilla (Quechua, Hispanicized spelling Yana Cuchilla) is a mountain in the La Raya mountain range in the Andes of Peru, about  high. It is situated in the Puno Region, Melgar Province, Santa Rosa District. Yana Khuchilla lies northeast of the La Raya Pass, near the mountain Chimpulla.

References

Mountains of Peru
Mountains of Puno Region